Henry Alfred Hosking (6 August 1908 – 3 June 1957) was a Liberal party member of the House of Commons of Canada. He was born in Bellows Falls, Vermont, United States and moved with his family to Canada, at Rockwood, Ontario later in his birth year.

He attended Guelph Collegiate Vocational Institute then Queen's University where he graduated with a Bachelor of Science in 1933. His career included jobs as a mechanical engineer, a merchant and president of Hosking Motors.

During World War II, he served with the Canadian Army's Canadian Military Engineers. In 1948 and 1949, he was a city councillor for Guelph City Council.

Hosking was first elected to Parliament at the Wellington South riding in the 1949 general election then re-elected for a second term in 1953.

In April 1957, Hosking was en route to Ottawa when he fell ill. He was taken off the train at Oshawa station and sent to Toronto Wellesley Hospital where he received an operation. In late May, he was admitted to Guelph's St. Joseph's Hospital with symptoms of pancreatitis. Hosking died there on 3 June 1957, one week before the federal election in which he was registered as a candidate. As a result, the vote at Wellington South was delayed until 15 July in order to establish a new set of nominees for the riding.

Electoral record

References

External links
 

1908 births
1957 deaths
American expatriates in Canada
Canadian merchants
Liberal Party of Canada MPs
Members of the House of Commons of Canada from Ontario
Guelph city councillors
People from Bellows Falls, Vermont